An electronic apex locator  is an electronic device used in endodontics to determine the position of the apical constriction and thus determine the length of the root canal space. The apex of the root has a specific resistance to electrical current, and this is measured using a pair of electrodes typically hooked into the lip and attached to an endodontic file.
The electronic principle is relatively simple and is based on electrical resistance; when a circuit is complete (tissue is contacted by the tip of the file), resistance decreases markedly and current suddenly begins to flow. Various devices signal this event by a beep, a buzz, a flashing light, digital readouts, or a pointer on a dial.

History and uses
The original electronic apex locators operated on the direct current principle. A problem with these devices was that conductive fluids such as hemorrhage, exudate, or irrigant in the canal would permit current flow and therefore a false reading. Newer devices are impedance-based, using alternating current of two frequencies;these measure and compare two electrical impedances that change as the file moves apically. The benefit is that these devices are much less affected by fluid
conductive media in the canal. The impedance type apex locators have been demonstrated to be 80 to 95% accurate in identifying the apical foramen. Therefore after obtaining a reading, 1 to 2 mm is subtracted as the corrected working length.

Electronic apex locators have been shown to be more accurate than radiography when determining the position of the apical foramen.

Adaptive Apex Locators 
Adaptive Apex Locator overcomes as the disadvantages of the popular apex locators 4th generation – low accuracy on working in wet canals, as well the disadvantages of devices V th generation – difficulty on working in dry canals and necessarily of compulsory, additional wetting.
Adaptive Apex Locator continuously defines humidity of the canal and immediately adapts for dry or wet canal. On this way is possible to be measured as in dry and in additional wetted canals as well, canals with blood or exudates, canals with still not-extirpated pulp.

See also
 Apex location

External links

 The use of apex locators in the diagnosis of perforations, Dr. Yosef Nahmias, Endodontic Magazine

Dental equipment
Dentistry